Possehl may refer to:

, a group of industrial companies
, a foundation created from the estate of Emil Possehl
SS_Possehl, a German cargo ship in service 1921-45
, a street in Lübeck, Germany

Possehl is a surname and may refer to:
Gregory Possehl, an American professor of anthropology
 (1850–1919), German businessman, entrepreneur and patron of the arts
 (* 1992), German handball player
Lou Possehl, an American baseball player
 (* 1943), German painter and steel sculptor
 (1900–1994), German actress